Theophilus served as Greek Patriarch of Alexandria between 1010 and 1020, during the persecution of the Christians under the Fatimid caliph al-Hakim.

References

11th-century Patriarchs of Alexandria
Melkites in the Fatimid Caliphate